Gaia Afrania ( 1st century BC) was the wife of the senator Licinius Buccio. Afrania was born into an old plebeian family, the gens Afrania. She lived during the chaotic time of the breakup of the Republic, dying in 48 BC.  She often brought suits to court.  Perhaps the sister of Lucius Afranius, consul in 60, she always pleaded her own cases before the praetor instead of waiting for male family members to defend her, thus giving occasion to the publishing of the edict which forbade all women to postulate. Valerius Maximus's narrative indicates that she was successfully able to argue her cases, although he looked upon it negatively. Ulpian condemns Afrania as the cause for the edict, stating that it was meant to prevent women's involvement in the legal business of others. He believed that it was too immodest for women and that it was a duty for males.

See also
 Afrania gens
 Gaia Afrania on feminaeromanae.org

References

48 BC deaths
1st-century BC Roman women
1st-century BC Romans
Gaia
Year of birth unknown